Mangalorean cuisine is a collective name given to the cuisine of Mangalore.

Since Mangalore is a coastal town, fish forms the staple diet of most people. Mangalorean Catholics' Sanna-Dukra Maas (Sanna – idli fluffed with toddy or yeast; Dukra Maas – Pork), Pork Bafat, Sorpotel and the Mutton Biryani of the Muslims are well-known dishes. Snacks such as happala, sandige and puli munchi are unique to Mangalore. Khali (toddy), a country liquor prepared from coconut flower sap, is popular.

Meat-based cuisine

Their curry uses a lot of coconut and curry leaves while ginger, garlic and chilli are also used. Mangalorean Catholic cuisine has distinct Portuguese influence as can be seen in Laitao, the famous pork roast served as the Pièce de résistance at wedding dinners, and Pork Sorpotel. Mangalorean Catholics mix pork blood and other parts in most of their pork delicacies as can be seen from Pork Bafat, Cabidela and Kalleze un Kiti (heart and intestines). Sanna-Dukra Maas (Sanna – idli fluffed with toddy or yeast; Dukra Maas – Pork) and Unde-Dukra Maas (Unde – leavened bread; Dukra Maas – Pork) are popular dishes. Bokrea Maas (mutton) and Kunkda Maas (chicken) with dishes such as Chicken Indaz are popular. The traditional Rosachi kadi (Ros Curry), a fish curry made with ros (coconut milk) is quite popular and is served during the Ros (anointing) ceremony that is held one or two days before a Mangalorean Catholic wedding. Their fish curry, especially their Fish Roe Curry, is known for its taste in the whole of coastal India while fried fish in their style is well known. The Sheveo Roce and Pathal Bakri (a variant of Kori Rotti) are dry rice flakes dipped in chicken gravy dishes.

See also
Saraswat Brahmins
Shivalli
Bunts

Notes

References

 Udupi Cuisine by U.B.Rajalakshmi published by Prism Books Pvt Ltd. 

 
Mangalore
Vegetarian dishes of India
Karnataka cuisine
Culture of Mangalore